Return of the Frog Queen is a solo album by Jeremy Enigk, recorded following his brief retirement from music due to the temporary split of Sunny Day Real Estate. It was recorded with a 21-piece orchestra and released in 1996. It has a slower and quieter sound than Sunny Day Real Estate's often-bombastic albums.

The album was recorded after Enigk converted to Christianity; this conversion had been originally thought to have brought on the disbanding of Sunny Day Real Estate, which was later cleared up as a smaller part of more internal struggles in the band. Sunny Day Real Estate reunited in 1997, when they released How It Feels to Be Something On. The sound of that record furthers the mellower sound developed on Return of the Frog Queen.

According to the 1997 Sub Pop mail-order catalog, Lou Barlow, of fellow Sub Pop band Sebadoh, cited Frog Queen as his favorite album of 1996.

Critical reception
Trouser Press called the album "magical," writing that "other than some Beatlisms, the record occasionally suggests how Syd Barrett might have sounded had he been able to mount a full-fledged production effort, but there’s so much else going on here that any sense of nostalgia quickly evaporates." MusicHound Rock: The Essential Album Guide wrote that "Enigk and his keening, crackly tenor forge an intriguing recording reminiscent of early '70s British psychedelic pop." The New Rolling Stone Album Guide called the album "dazzling, if enigmatic, orchestral pop." In its review of the album's reissue, Pitchfork wrote that Return of the Frog Queen's "orchestral grandeur helped shape indie rock's future."

Track listing
"Abegail Anne" – 3:01
"Return of the Frog Queen" – 3:30
"Lewis Hollow" – 1:58
"Lizard" – 3:14
"Carnival" – 4:03
"Call Me Steam" – 2:48
"Explain" – 3:29
"Shade and the Black Hat" – 4:58
"Fallen Heart" – 2:22

Personnel

Christine Gunn – Cello
Joe Bichsel – Cello
Anna Doak – Bass (Upright)
Jeremy Enigk – Bass, Guitar, Piano, Arranger, Drums, Harp, Harpsichord, Vocals, Engineer, Design
Carlos Flores – Violin
Jeni Foster – Harp
William Goldsmith – Drums
Fred Hawkinson – Trombone (Bass)
Cathy Lauer – Assistant Engineer
Greg Lyons – Trumpet
Felicia McFall – Viola
Roberta Newland – Flute, Piccolo
Joe LeBlanc – Clarinet
Mark Nichols – Arranger, Conductor
Charles Peterson – Photography
Beverly Reese – Percussion, Glockenspiel
Laura Sperling – Flute, Piccolo
Chris Stover – Trombone
Hank Trotter – Design
Sam Williams – Viola
Greg Williamson – Producer, Engineer, Mixing
Ken Wright – Violin
Curry Wyrick – Assistant Engineer

References

1996 albums
Jeremy Enigk albums
Orchestra people